Nuno Frederico Correia da Silva Lobato Markl (born 21 July 1971), known as Nuno Markl, is a Portuguese comedian, writer, radio host, television host, voice actor and screenwriter. He was born in Lisbon.

Career

Radio
Markl is well known in Portugal for his radio series "O Homem Que Mordeu o Cão" (The Man Who Bit The dog). It started in 1997, when he joined Pedro Ribeiro, José Carlos Malato and Ana Lamy for the morning show at Rádio Comercial. In 2001, Malato and Lamy left, and were replaced by Maria de Vasconcelos. The radio series later spawned a TV show, and three books. 

Since October 2008, Markl has worked for Antena 3, with his current shows being "São Coisas Que Acontecem", "Laboratolarilolela" (a showcase of lesser known Pimba artists and songs), and "Nuno & Nando" (with Fernando Alvim). Before "São Coisas Que Acontecem", he ran "Há Vida em Markl" (based on a comic strip formerly published on Inimigo Público) and "O Livro dos Porquês" (where funny answers were given to mundane factoid questions). Another one of his most famous radio shows is Caderneta de Cromos, which ran on Rádio Comercial. In it, he reminisced about nostalgic things from his childhood. 

He has another show on Rádio Comercial,  Grandiosa História Universal das Traquitanas, which discusses mankind's inventions.

Television
Nuno Markl debuted on television in 2001, co-hosting "Sem Filtro" (a youth-oriented talk show on RTP1) alongside Rita Mendes and Gaspar Borges. He then moved to SIC Radical, where he worked on two different projects revolving around his other passion, film. Also in SIC Radical, he had a television show with Fernando Alvim, O Perfeito Anormal, which launched the comedy troupe Gato Fedorento. 

He wrote many cult sketches for Herman José, especially for his show "Herman Enciclopédia". He wrote for the prematurely cancelled Programa da Maria (which had some Upright Citizens Brigade influenced sketches) and now writes for Os Contemporâneos. Nuno regularly updates his weblog, A Cave do Markl, providing movie reviews, video blogs, and updates on his work. Other side projects include TV and print ads for Café Delta and performing voice acting duties for the Portuguese version of films:

 "Spike" in Flushed Away;
 "Raphael" in Teenage Mutant Ninja Turtles;
 "Barry B. Benson" in Bee Movie

He was also responsible for translating and adapting Monty Python sketches for an onstage Portuguese version, performed by, among others, Bruno Nogueira, Miguel Guilherme, António Feio and José Pedro Gomes.

Personal life
Nuno Markl lives in the Greater Lisbon area. On 3 September 2010, he married the radio and television show host Ana Galvão, with whom he has a son, Pedro, born 7 June 2009.  In 2016, they announced their divorce.

Nuno and Ana are well known advocates for children's and animal rights.

References

External links
 A Cave do Markl – Markl's weblog

1971 births
Living people
Portuguese male voice actors
Portuguese male comedians
People from Lisbon
Portuguese people of Austrian descent